The musical term colossale  indicates that the performer is to play the so marked passage in a fashion that suggests immensity. An example of this rare expression can be found at the climax of the huge cadenza in the first movement of Prokofiev's Second Piano Concerto in combination with the dynamic instruction fff.

Italian words and phrases
Musical notation